Xi'an Polytechnic University is a college located in Xi'an, in the Shaanxi province, China.

History 
Xi'an Polytechnic University enjoys a long history which can be traced back to 1912 when it was the Weaving Division of the Beijing Higher Industrial School. The school was approved in 1978 to set up the Northwest Textile Institute, one of the three national institutions controlled directly by the national Ministry of Textiles. In 1998, control transferred to the Shaanxi Province Ministry of Education. In 2001, the school changed its name to Xi'an Institute of Engineering and Technology, then changed to Xi'an Polytechnic University in 2006.

XPU is a large-scale university with 10 colleges and 2 teaching departments, with over 24,000 students. There are 2 campuses, covering an area of 1,080,000 square meters.

References

External links 
  Official site
 Official site

Engineering universities and colleges in China
Public universities
Universities and colleges in Xi'an
Educational institutions established in 1912
1912 establishments in China